Mouth of the Architect is an American heavy metal band from Dayton, Ohio, creating music influenced by and similar to Neurosis, Isis, Pelican, Cult of Luna, and various post-metal bands. They are signed to Translation Loss Records and have released five full-length studio albums and one EP to date.

Biography
Mouth of the Architect formed in 2003 with the lineup of Jason Watkins (vocals, keyboards), Gregory Lahm (vocals, guitar), Alex Vernon (vocals, guitar), Dave Mann (drums), and Derik Sommer (bass). They released their first album Time and Withering in 2004 on Translation Loss Records. Sommer departed the band in 2005.

Soon after the band released a split with label mates Kenoma in 2006, Vernon left, leaving Lahm to record all the guitar parts on their second album The Ties That Blind which was released in August, and featured Brent Hinds of Mastodon on guest vocals on one track. Brian Cook of Botch, Russian Circles, and These Arms are Snakes stood in to play bass on the album. To support The Ties That Blind, the band toured extensively around the United States, while weathering several line-up changes.  In 2006 the band toured alongside These Arms Are Snakes, with Dan Wilburn of The Science Logic replacing Vernon on guitar.  2007 saw newcomer Steve Brooks replace Wilburn, followed by a year of near constant touring alongside bands including Mastodon, Rob Crow, Made Out of Babies, Big Business, Torche, Kylessa, 400 Blows, Skeletonwitch and Unsane, among others.  The band featured Joe Lester of Intronaut and Kevin Schindel of Twelve Tribes on bass during this time.

Their third album, Quietly, was recorded after Lahm in turn left the band, with Vernon returning alongside Brooks to jointly handle guitars and vocals, and Schindel providing bass.  Soon after the release of the album in 2008, Vernon left yet again with Schindel switching to guitar.  An EP entitled The Violence Beneath followed in 2010, with a headlining European tour to support the record.  The tour featured appearances at Roadburn Festival and Asymmetry Festival.  Recorded in October 2009 by John Lakes, The Violence Beneath featured two new studio tracks with Joe Lester on bass, an old live track from 2007 as well as a Peter Gabriel cover with Lakes on bass.  Evan Danielson joined as permanent bassist following its release. The band returned to the studio in October 2011 to lay down a track for French compilation Falling Down VII which was released the following April.

Their fourth full-length album, Dawning, was released in June 2013. Recorded at Brooks' studio in Michigan, the album was self-produced by Brookes and Lakes. A US/Canada tour with Intronaut and Scale the Summit and a headlining European tour took place that summer with Lakes filling in for Schindel during both legs of the tour on guitar. Lakes soon replaced Schindel as a full-time member.

Their fifth full-length album, Path of Eight, released in October 2016, was recorded live in the bands' rehearsal space in Dayton over a weekend. It is a concept album "about a soul leaving the body after death, traveling through space and time, past the gods, to be torn apart into the nothingness from which we came".

On 28 March 2018, the band announced the departure of Steve Brooks on their Facebook page and that founding member Alex Vernon had rejoined the band.

Schindel, Vernon, Mann and Brooks have been members of the band Twelve Tribes at various points in the past.

Discography
Time and Withering CD (2004, Translation Loss) (re-issued on LP in 2017)
Mouth of the Architect/Kenoma split CD & LP (2006, Translation Loss) Track: Sleepwalk Powder
The Ties That Blind CD & LP (2006, Translation Loss) (re-issued on CD & LP in 2018)
For the Sick (Eyehategod tribute album, 2007, Emetic Records) Track: Story of the Eye
Quietly CD & LP (22 July 2008, Translation Loss)
The Violence Beneath EP CD (17 April 2010, Translation Loss)
Falling Down IIV compilation album (28 April 2012, Falling Down) Track: How This Will End
Dawning CD & LP (25 June 2013, Translation Loss)
Path of Eight CD & LP (7 October 2016, Translation Loss)

Members
Jason Watkins – vocals, keyboards, samples (2003–present)
Dave Mann – drums (2003–present)
Alex Vernon – guitar, vocals (2003-2005, 2007–2008, 2018-present)
Canada Marsh - guitar (2018–present)
Caleb Nason - bass (2018–present)

Former members
Steve Brooks – guitar, vocals (2007–2018)
Evan Danielson - bass guitar (2010–2017)
John Lakes - guitar, vocals (2015–2017)
Kevin Schindel – bass guitar, vocals (2007-2008), guitar, vocals (2008-2015)
Gregory Lahm – guitar, vocals (2003-2007)
Derik Sommer – bass guitar (2003-2005)

Session members
Chris Common - bass guitar (Mouth of the Architect/Kenoma, 2006) Track: Sleepwalk Powder
Brian Cook - bass guitar (The Ties That Blind, 2006)
Joe Lester - bass guitar (The Violence Beneath, 2010)
John Lakes - bass guitar (The Violence Beneath, 2010) Track: In Your Eyes

Touring members
Dan Wilburn - guitar (live 2006)
Zack Pahl - bass guitar (live 2006)
Joe Lester - bass guitar (live 2006-2007)
John Lakes - guitar, vocals (live 2009, 2013)
Kevin Schindel – bass guitar, vocals (live 2007–2008, 2017)
Tate Matthews - guitar (live 2017)

Timeline

References

External links
Mouth of the Architect interview by Roy Christopher, April 25, 2013
Review of Mouth of the Architect - Quietly on Highbeamreview.com
Official Facebook Page
Official MySpace Page
Translation Loss Records
Mouth of the Architect at exclaim
Mouth of the Architect at punknews

Heavy metal musical groups from Ohio
American sludge metal musical groups
American post-metal musical groups
American doom metal musical groups
Musical groups established in 2003
Musical groups from Dayton, Ohio
Musical quartets